Kastanonas is an Aromanian village and a community of the Zagori municipality. Before the 2011 local government reform it was part of the municipality of East Zagori, of which it was a municipal district. The 2011 census recorded 30 inhabitants in the village. The community of Kastanonas covers an area of 9.551 km2.

See also
List of settlements in the Ioannina regional unit

References

Populated places in Ioannina (regional unit)
Aromanian settlements in Greece